Holy Rosary Academy, located in Anchorage, Alaska, United States, is a classical Roman Catholic independent school for grades K-12.

Description
The Academy was founded in 1987 by a group of Catholic parents in Anchorage who desired a school where a sound education in Catholicism would be an essential part of their children's academic progress. It has grown from a small student body of just eighteen students to more than 160 in grades K-12. 

It is recognized as the best private high school in Alaska and is one of the top Catholic high schools in the country (Catholic High School Honor Roll, The Best Private High School in Every State). The school's academic focus is on classical education focusing on fundamental educational skills of reading, writing and arithmetic as well as philosophical thought and classical languages, Latin and Greek.

Holy Rosary Academy is accredited through the National Association of Private Catholic Independent Schools and is a member of the Institute for Catholic Liberal Education.

Mission 
Holy Rosary Academy assists parents, the primary educators, to form students in faith, reason, and virtue through a classical education in the Roman Catholic Tradition.

See also

Catholic schools in the United States
List of high schools in Alaska
Higher education
Parochial school

References
https://www.hraak.org/about-us

External links
 National Association of Private Catholic Independent Schools
 Holy Rosary Academy

1987 establishments in Alaska
Educational institutions established in 1987
High schools in Anchorage, Alaska
Catholic secondary schools in Alaska
Private schools in Alaska
Private elementary schools in Alaska
Private middle schools in Alaska
Private high schools in Alaska